Artesia Boulevard is a west-east thoroughfare in Los Angeles County and Orange County.

Route description

Artesia Boulevard begins at the intersection with Pacific Coast Highway. West of this point, Artesia Boulevard becomes Gould Avenue and later 27th Street. The South Bay Galleria is located at the intersection with Hawthorne Boulevard. The westernmost segment of Artesia Boulevard passes through the cities of Hermosa Beach, Manhattan Beach, Redondo Beach, Lawndale, Torrance, Gardena and Los Angeles. Artesia Boulevard breaks off briefly at Avalon Boulevard, and much of this portion of Artesia Boulevard parallels SR 91. After reuniting, the easternmost segment of Artesia Boulevard passes through Carson, Compton, Long Beach, Bellflower, Cerritos, and La Mirada. Artesia Boulevard then crosses the county line upon entering Buena Park and also enters the city Fullerton as Artesia Avenue.

Artesia Avenue terminates at Gilbert Street in Fullerton near the Fullerton Airport.

Transportation
Artesia Boulevard is serviced by Long Beach Transit line 141 between the Metro A Line station (located near its intersection with Acacia Avenue in Compton) and Los Cerritos Center, and Torrance Transit line 13 between the A Line station and Redondo Beach.

The southern end of the Metro J Line, Harbor Gateway Transit Center, was formerly named Artesia Transit Center, based on nearby Artesia Boulevard.

Streets in Los Angeles County, California
Streets in Orange County, California
Boulevards in the United States
Streets in Los Angeles
Transportation in Long Beach, California
Transportation in Torrance, California
Artesia, California
Buena Park, California
La Mirada, California
Cerritos, California
Bellflower, California
Compton, California
Carson, California
Gardena, California
Lawndale, California
Redondo Beach, California
Manhattan Beach, California
Hermosa Beach, California